Joseph F. Gregory (1862 – 3 November 1926) was a British trade union leader.

Born in London, Gregory undertook an apprenticeship as a stonemason at Caldecote in Warwickshire.  He successfully completed this, and then joined the Operative Stonemasons' Society.  Early in the 1880s, he was appointed as the union's representative on the Leicester Building Trades Council, and this started a rapid rise to prominence, as Gregory won election to the union's executive, and then as its president.

In 1890, Gregory moved back to London, and was chosen to represent his union on the London Trades Council.  He served as chair of the union around the turn of the century, and represented the council on the London County Council's Technical Education Board.

Gregory was elected as the general secretary of the National League of the Blind in 1904, and held the post until his death, late in 1926.

References

1862 births
1926 deaths
Trade unionists from London
British trade union leaders
English stonemasons